Richard Gariseb (born 3 February 1980 in Okahandja) is a Namibian football defender. He plays for Bhawanipore F.C. and Namibia national football team.

He was a participant at the 2008 African Cup of Nations.

External links

1980 births
Living people
People from Okahandja
Namibian men's footballers
Namibia international footballers
2008 Africa Cup of Nations players
Namibian expatriate sportspeople in South Africa
Namibian expatriate sportspeople in India
Namibian expatriate footballers
Bidvest Wits F.C. players
Association football defenders
Expatriate soccer players in South Africa
Orlando Pirates S.C. players
Expatriate footballers in India
Bhawanipore FC players